Karpovskaya is a rural locality (a village) in Spasskoye Rural Settlement, Tarnogsky District, Vologda Oblast, Russia. The population was 27 as of 2002.

Geography 
Karpovskaya is located 28 km northwest of Tarnogsky Gorodok (the district's administrative centre) by road. Akulovskaya is the nearest rural locality.

References 

Rural localities in Tarnogsky District